Awheaturris pahaoensis is an extinct species of sea snail, a marine gastropod mollusk in the family Raphitomidae.

Description
The length of the shell attains 8.3 mm, its diameter 4.1 mm.

Distribution
Fossils of this marine species were found in Miocene strata in New Zealand; age range: 11.608 to 5.332 Ma.

References

 Maxwell, P.A. (2009). Cenozoic Mollusca. pp 232–254 in Gordon, D.P. (ed.) New Zealand inventory of biodiversity. Volume one. Kingdom Animalia: Radiata, Lophotrochozoa, Deuterostomia. Canterbury University Press, Christchurch

External links
 Vella, Paul. "Tertiary Mollusca from south-east Wairarapa." Transactions of the Royal Society of New Zealand. Vol. 81. No. 4. 1954.

pahaoensis
Gastropods described in 1954